Umoe AS is a privately owned company based in Norway.

Jens Ulltveit-Moe founded the company in 1984 and it has since grown into one of the largest, privately owned companies in Norway with a market value of approximately NOK 5 billion. In 2010 the company had a turnover of NOK 6 969 mill, with 7,100 employees and capital employed of NOK 5 355 mill. The company has four main areas; Umoe Shipping and Energy, Umoe Maritime, Umoe Bioenergy and Umoe Restaurant Group.

Images of Umoe's activities

See also
Umoe Mandal

References

External links
Umoe.no: Umoe website

Conglomerate companies of Norway
Holding companies of Norway
Manufacturing companies of Norway
Holding companies established in 1984
Manufacturing companies established in 1984
Norwegian companies established in 1984